Yevgeny Petrovich Shapovalov was a Soviet army general who was awarded the title Hero of the Soviet Union.

Biography
Yevgeny Shapovalov was born on December 25, 1904, in the city of Taganrog into a worker's family. He received elementary education in a Taganrog's school and worked as a shoemaker.

He joined the Red Army in 1922 and received higher military education in Kharkiv (1925) and later at Frunze Military Academy (1944). He became a member of Communist Party of the Soviet Union in 1940.

During the German-Soviet War, lieutenant colonel Shapovalov commanded the 23rd Guards Infantry Division (Soviet Union), and was especially successful at the Battle of Berlin in April–May 1945. On May 31, 1945, he was awarded the titles of Hero of the Soviet Union, Order of Lenin and the Gold Star medal.

In 1951, he graduated from the Stalin Military Academy of Tank and Mechanized Forces.

In 1955, he retired and worked as director of a sovkhoz in Fastiv Raion of Kiev Oblast from 1960 to 1965, after which time he became a pensioner.

He died in Kiev on November 8, 1977, and is buried at Kyiv's Lukyanovskoe Military Cemetery.

Awards
Hero of the Soviet UnionOrder of Lenin (2)Order of the Red Banner (4)Gold Star

External links and references

Yevgeny Shapovalov at War Heroes web site

1904 births
1977 deaths
Military personnel from Taganrog
People from Don Host Oblast
Communist Party of the Soviet Union members
Soviet major generals
Soviet military personnel of World War II
Frunze Military Academy alumni
Heroes of the Soviet Union
Recipients of the Order of Lenin
Recipients of the Order of the Red Banner